SMS Bremse was a  minelaying light cruiser of the German Kaiserliche Marine. She was laid down by AG Vulcan Stettin on 27 April 1915 and launched on 11 March 1916 at Stettin, Germany, the second of the two-ship class after her sister, . She served during the First World War, operating most of the time in company with her sister. The two ships took part in an ambush on a convoy in the North Sea, where they sank two destroyers in a surprise attack, before hunting down and sinking nine merchantmen, after which they returned to port unscathed.

The Kaiserliche Marine considered sending the two ships to attack convoys in the Atlantic Ocean, but the difficulties associated with refueling at sea convinced the Germans to abandon the plan. Bremse was one of the ships interned at Scapa Flow under the terms of the armistice in November 1918. On 21 June 1919, the commander of the interned fleet, Rear Admiral Ludwig von Reuter, ordered the scuttling of the fleet. She was salvaged in 1929 by teams working for Ernest Cox, though they had to contend with large quantities of oil and the risks of fires and explosions. Having been brought back to the surface after a decade underwater, she was then scrapped.

Design

Her propulsion system consisted of two sets of steam turbines powered by two coal-fired and four oil-fired Marine-type water-tube boilers, which were ducted into three funnels. In service however, the ship reached .

The ship was armed with four  SK L/45 guns in single pedestal mounts; two were arranged forward on the centerline, forward and aft of the conning tower, and two were placed in a superfiring pair aft. They were supplied with 600 rounds of ammunition, for 150 shells per gun. Brummer also carried two  SK L/45 anti-aircraft guns mounted on the centerline astern of the funnels. She was also equipped with a pair of  torpedo tubes with four torpedoes in a swivel mount amidships. Designed as a minelayer, she carried 400 mines.

Career
Bremse was ordered under the contract name Mine Steamer D and laid down at the AG Vulcan shipyard in Stettin on 27 April 1915. She was launched on 11 March 1916, after which fitting-out work commenced. Completed in less than four months, she was commissioned into the High Seas Fleet on 1 July 1916.

Over the period 11–20 October 1916, Bremse and Brummer served with the High Seas Fleet in the North Sea. On 10 January 1917, the two ships laid a minefield off Norderney. They escorted minesweepers on 1–13 March based in Emden and Wilhelmshaven. Their first major offensive operation was an attack on a British convoy in October 1917. Britain had agreed to ship  tons of coal per month to Norway, and a regular stream of convoys carrying shipments of coal was crossing the North Sea by late 1917. These were usually weakly escorted by only a couple of destroyers and armed trawlers. Attempts to interdict them with U-boats had to that point been ineffective, so Admiral Reinhard Scheer, the chief of the Admiralstab, decided to deploy a surface force to carry out a surprise attack to supplement the U-boat campaign. In addition to damaging British shipping, Scheer sought to divert escorts from the Atlantic theater, where his U-boats were concentrated. Bremse, commanded by Fregattenkapitän Westerkamp, and Brummer, commanded by Fregattenkapitän Leonhardi, were selected for the first such operation. Their high speed and large radius of action, coupled with their resemblance to British light cruisers, made them suited to the task. In preparation for the raid, their crews painted the ships dark gray to further camouflage them as British vessels.

At dawn lookouts aboard Stronghold reported two unidentified ships closing on the convoy. Mary Rose tried to come to her assistance but was also hit; both ships were quickly sunk. Brummer and Bremse then turned their attention to the convoy, hunting down and sinking nine of the merchantmen, before returning to port. One of the armed trawlers, the Elise, was fired on by Bremse while attempting to pick up survivors. None of the ships were able to send a wireless report, and despite having a squadron of sixteen light cruisers at sea to the south of the convoy, the British did not learn of the attack until 16:00, when it was too late. Admiral David Beatty said of the action that 'luck was against us.' The Admiralty responded to the raid by adding more and bigger escorts.

Late in the war, the Admiralstab considered sending Brummer and Bremse on a commerce raiding mission into the Atlantic. They were to operate off the Azores in concert with an oiler. The central Atlantic was out of the normal range of the U-boats, and convoys were therefore lightly defended in the area. The Admiralstab canceled the plan, however, after it was determined that refueling at sea would be too difficult. On 2 April 1918, Bremse laid a minefield consisting of 304 mines in the North Sea. She laid another 150 mines in the same area on 11 April. Bremse and her sister ended the month with a fleet sortie with the rest of the battle fleet on 22–24 April. On 11 May, Bremse laid another minefield in the North Sea with 400 mines. Three days later, she laid another 420 mines in the North Sea. She was to have been part of the final sortie of the High Seas Fleet in October 1918, but the operation was cancelled due to the outbreak of mutiny in the German Fleet.

Internment and scuttling

Along with the most modern units of the High Seas Fleet, Brummer and Bremse were included in the ships specified for internment at Scapa Flow by the victorious Allied powers. The ships steamed out of Germany on 21 November 1918 in single file, commanded by Rear Admiral Ludwig von Reuter. They were met at sea by a combined fleet of 370 British, American, and French warships. The fleet arrived in the Firth of Forth later that day, and between 25 and 27 November, they were escorted to Scapa Flow. Upon arrival, all wireless equipment was removed from the ships and the breech blocks of their heavy guns taken to prevent their use. Crews were reduced to minimum levels.

The fleet remained in captivity during the negotiations that ultimately produced the Treaty of Versailles. Reuter believed that the British intended to seize the German ships on 21 June 1919, which was the deadline for Germany to have signed the peace treaty. Unaware that the deadline had been extended to the 23rd, Reuter ordered the ships to be sunk at the next opportunity. On the morning of 21 June, the British fleet left Scapa Flow to conduct training maneuvers, and at 11:20 Reuter transmitted the order to his ships. An armed British naval party had attempted to board Bremse and close her bottom valves, but found that they were already below the rising waterline. Instead they blasted off her anchor chains and she was taken in tow by a tug and the destroyer , in an attempt to beach her before she sank.

Salvage

Though the Admiralty arranged for some of the ships to be salvaged, most were left at the bottom of the sound until entrepreneur Ernest Cox bought the salvage rights and began to raise the remaining ships in the early 1920s. Bremse presented particular challenges. She had come to rest perched precariously on a rock, which sloped away dramatically, causing fears that she might slip off and sink in deeper water. Cox's salvage team sealed her bulkheads and divided the hull into watertight compartments. The hull was patched up and an airlock fitted, but the team ran into difficulties with the large amount of oil which covered the wreck, more than had been found in any other of the ships salvaged previously. A three-man team using oxyacetylene torches ignited some oil, causing an explosion. The men escaped without serious injuries, and thereafter small explosions and fires were common over the two months it took to prepare the ship, though no one was injured.

By July 1929 the last of the superstructure had been cleared, and Bremse was turned upside down using techniques developed on salvaging some of the destroyers. Compressors were then used to pump air into the hull and bring her to the surface, while she was supported by 9-inch wires attached to two floating docks anchored on her port shoreward side. The salvage teams had almost raised her when she suddenly toppled onto her side and then heeled over gradually during the night, settling onto the rocks inshore.

It was thought that the failure had been caused by there being too much remaining superstructure, and attempts were made to clean out the large quantity of oil that had spilled out during the attempt to raise her. The decision was made to burn off the oil, but the fire spread and had to be brought back under control. She was again patched up and pumped with air, breaking the surface on 29 November. Bremse was eventually considered too unsafe to tow to Rosyth for scrapping, as had been done with the other ships Cox had salvaged, and instead she was taken to Lyness on 30 November 1929. The ship-breaking work lasted until May 1931.

Notes

References

Further reading
 

Brummer-class cruisers
Ships built in Stettin
1916 ships
World War I cruisers of Germany
World War I minelayers of Germany
World War I warships scuttled at Scapa Flow
Maritime incidents in 1919